Troels Frederik Troels-Lund (5 September 1840 – 12 February 1921) was a Danish historian.

Biography
Lund was born in Copenhagen. He was the youngest son of Henrik Ferdinand Lund, Søren Kierkegaard’s Nephew. Henrik Ferdinand was the brother of the naturalist Peter Wilhelm Lund.

He entered the University of Copenhagen in 1858. After studying theology for a while he abandoned it for the study of history. From 1870-1875 he was assistant at the Danish . He was also appointed historiographer royal to the king of Denmark and Comptroller of the Order of the Dannebrog. Later, he was an instructor in history at the military school at Copenhagen. In 1888 he was made full professor of history, and produced many profound volumes mostly devoted to the subject of Scandinavian history during the sixteenth century.

Information Annual reports Troels Lund as the winner of the Nobel Prize in Literature for 1915, sharing the prize with three others, however the Nobel website only lists one recipient for that year, not Lund.

Colleagues
Lund nominated Georg Brandes for the Nobel Prize several times.

Kierkegaard 

In 1913 a bust of Søren Kierkegaard was proposed. When the sculptor, Rikard Magnussen, proposed the idea to Lund, then in his eighties, he didn't support the proposal, he is quoted as saying, "But didn't you know what he was like? Soren Kierkegaard was a hunchback." In the early 1900s biographers were interested in finding out what Kierkegaard was like on the outside. Kierkegaard also wrote much about Socrates.

He related different stories about Kierkegaard. One story described Kierkegaard's playfulness: "He [Kierkegaard] was an unseen witness to a conversation between two poorhouse inmates. The first said: "It’s the devil that one never is happy." The other: "Nonsense! What’s happiness?" The first: "I would be if an angel dropped down from heaven and gave me a ‘blue one.’" This Kierkegaard could not resist. Ho took a five-dollar note (a "blue one") from his purse, stepped up, presented it with a deep bow, and disappeared without saying a word." In 1854 he sat in on discussions between his mother, Anna Kathrine, and Kierkegaard about whether or not Mynster was a "real Christian or not", he was 16 years old at the time. He visited Kierkegaard in the hospital and was a witness to his burial.

According to Lund, Kierkegaard spent half of his fortune on publishing his own works, he refused to accept interest on his money "on Old Testament grounds", and he also gave much of his money to the poor. Kierkegaard says the same: "I almost never made a visit, and at home the rule was strictly observed to receive no one except the poor who came to seek help."

Works
Lund's first work, which appeared in 1871, an erudite biography of Socrates, gave him a great reputation among continental scholars.
His next important work, Historiske Skitser, did not appear until 1876, but after that time his activity was stupendous. In 1879 the first volume of his Danmarks og Norges Historie i Slutningen of det Xvi. Aarhundrede, a history of daily life in Denmark and Norway at the close of the 16th century, was published. His work said little about kings, armies and governments, but instead concentrated attention on the lives of the ordinary men and women of the age with which he deals. He used these common people to illustrate a vast body of documents previously neglected by the official historians.

List
Paa Vandring, 1867 (under pseudonym Poul Vedel)
Historiske Skitser - Efter utrykte Kilder, 1876
Mogens Heinesøn - Et tidsbillede fra det 16 Aarhundrede, 1877
Dagligt Liv i Norden i det sekstende Aarhundrede I-XIV, 1879-1901 (First edition under title Danmark og Norges Historie i Slutningen af det 16de Aarhundrede — "History of Denmark and Norway to the End of the Sixteenth Century")
Om Danmarks Forsvar, 1880
Preussens fald og Genoprejsning, 1883
Om Danmarks Neutralitet, 1886
Christian den Fjerdes Skib paa Skanderborg Sø I-II, 1893
Livsbelysning, 1899
Sundhedsbegreber i Norden i det 16de Aarhundrede, 1900
Peder Oxe, 1906
De tre Nordiske Brødrefolk, 1906
Nye Tanker i det 16de Aarhundrede, 1909
Historiske Fortællinger - Tider og Tanker I-IV, 1910–1912
Bakkehus og Solbjerg - Træk af et nyt Livssyns Udvikling i Norden I-III, 1920–1922
Et Liv - Barndom og Ungdom, 1924

References

Sources
 Kierkegaard The Cripple, by Theodor Haecker, translated by C. Vasn O. Bruyn, With and Introduction by A. Dru, Published 1950 by the Philosophical Library Inc.
 Soren Kierkegaard, A Biography, by Johannes Hohlenberg, Translated by T.H. Croxall, Pantheon Books 1954
 Kierkegaard, by Josiah Thompson, Alfred A. Knopf, 1973

External links
 

1840 births
1921 deaths
19th-century Danish historians
20th-century Danish historians